Yugotours was, at one time, the UK's fourth-biggest tour operator and travel agent.

History

Early history

The Yugoslavian carrier Aviogenex operated regular charters from the Manston (later Kent International Airport) to the then-popular beach resorts of Dalmatia in Yugoslavia on behalf of Yugotours from its formation in 1957, gaining ground in the 1970s as foreign holidays became increasingly popular, and even more so in the 1980s.

End

By the end of the 1980s, before the Yugoslavia’s break up, the country was the UK’s second most popular overseas holiday destination behind Spain. During this heyday, the tour operator sent close to 500,000 holidaymakers a year to Yugoslavia.

By the early 1990s as Yugoslavia’s political framework came under strain, Yugotours faced fierce competition from then market leaders Thomson. By 1992, with Yugoslavia embroiled in inter-ethnic warfare, there were fears over the future of the brand, with fears of it being relegated to sub-brand status or dropped altogether. These fears were reaffirmed by Alison Gray, Yugotours marketing manager, who remarked that "It's a delicate balance. For those who link Yugotours to Yugoslavia negatively, it could be a turn-off." Into this vacuum Thomson, Lunn Poly and Owners Abroad stepped in left by the collapse of the International Leisure Group with it brands like Club 18-30, Global, Intasun.

However, the brand survived until 2007, providing holidays to the newly independent former Yugoslav republics, mostly Croatia. From 2007, it was finally absorbed into the Med-Choice brand, covering the whole Mediterranean area.

Other 
Yugotours was famous for its 1986 catchphrase "Sun-sational Yugoslavia!"

Yugotours staff reunion 
In May 2019, more than a decade after its final collapse, around 120 former employees met at a resort in Porec, present-day Croatia for a reunion. The four-day event included a cocktail party, a boat trip to Rovinj via the Lim Fjord, and a Grand Yugotours Reunion gala dinner in Villa Polesini.

See also
 MyTravel Group
 Clarksons Travel Group

References

External links 
 Yugoslavia state tourism and how it affects your holidays today
 Профил предузећа, Yugotours dоо
 

1959 establishments in the United Kingdom
2007 disestablishments in the United Kingdom
Travel and holiday companies of Yugoslavia
Travel and holiday companies of the United Kingdom
Transport companies established in 1959
Transport companies disestablished in 2007